Max Lewis Ehrich ( 1992)  is an American actor, singer, and dancer.

Life and career
Ehrich was raised in Marlboro Township, New Jersey, in a Jewish family with mother Rhonda Ehrich and father Bruce Ehrich. He made his film debut starring in One Easy Job (2004), then had a supporting role as principal dancer in High School Musical 3: Senior Year. Breaking into television, Ehrich played Randy in two episodes of Ugly Betty. He then played 16-year-old jock Jesse Moretti in the 2009 Lifetime TV-movie The Pregnancy Pact, starring Thora Birch, Camryn Manheim, and Nancy Travis. He filmed two pilots for CBS in 2010, and has since shot another pilot as a recurring guest star for the new Country Music Television sitcom Working Class, starring Melissa Peterman. He played Adam in iStart A Fan War, a TV-movie for the Nickelodeon show iCarly.

In 2012, Ehrich joined the American CBS Daytime soap opera The Young and the Restless as Fenmore Baldwin. The following year he received a Daytime Emmy Award nomination for Outstanding Younger Actor in a Drama Series for his portrayal. Ehrich chose a scene where Fenmore tells Jamie that Summer is the one cyberbullying him. From 2014 through 2015, he appeared in a recurring role throughout CBS' Under the Dome, as Hunter May. He additionally has appeared on series including  Law & Order: Special Victims Unit. He had a recurring role on the Nickelodeon show 100 Things to Do Before High School, and appeared as Quinn in six episodes of Embeds. In 2019, Ehrich appeared in the Netflix film Walk. Ride. Rodeo.

Personal life
Ehrich and singer-songwriter Demi Lovato began dating in March 2020 and became engaged in July 2020. Two months later, the couple called off their engagement.

By November 2020, he was reported to be dating singer Mariah Angeliq.

Filmography and discography

Discography

Film

Television

Awards and nominations

References

External links
 

21st-century American male actors
American male dancers
American male film actors
American male television actors
Jewish American male actors
Living people
Male actors from New Jersey
People from Marlboro Township, New Jersey
1991 births
21st-century American Jews